Osniel Lazaro Melgarejo Hernández (born ) is a Cuban male volleyball player. He is part of the Cuba men's national volleyball team. On club level he plays for Allianz Milano.

Career
His career started in the provincial club of Sancti Spiritus in Cuba, participating in amateur tournaments. In 2015 he received his first call from the Cuban national team, winning the silver medal at the North American championship, while a year later he won the gold medal at the Pan-American Cup and the silver one on the same tournament with the U23 team. He also competed in the 2016 Summer Olympics in Rio de Janeiro.

For the 2016-17 season he received permission from the Cuban government to play abroad, thus signing with Panathinaikos of Greece.

Sporting achievements

National team
 2016  Pan-American Volleyball Cup
 2015  NORCECA Volleyball Championship
 2016  U23 Pan-American Volleyball Cup

References

External links
 Profile at FIVB.com

1997 births
Living people
Cuban men's volleyball players
Place of birth missing (living people)
Olympic volleyball players of Cuba
Volleyball players at the 2016 Summer Olympics
Panathinaikos V.C. players